Fumio Iwai (born 17 July 1960), is a Japanese politician who currently serves as the ambassador of Japan to Saudi Arabia, and previously served as the Ambassador of Japan to Iraq.

Diplomatic work 
Fumio Iwai was appointed to the "Japanese Foreign Ministry" and served as:
 Ambassador of Japan to Iraq
 Ambassador of Japan to Saudi Arabia

External links 
  Official Website

References

Living people
1951 births
People from Tokyo
Japanese expatriates in the United Kingdom
Ambassadors of Japan to Saudi Arabia
Ambassadors of Japan to Iraq
University of Arizona alumni